Born in 1976, Maine USA, Mike Libby is a contemporary American artist who created the Insect Lab in 1999 after graduating from the Rhode Island School of Design. Within this sculptural series, he combines real preserved insect specimens with mechanical components, in order to create whimsicals bio-cybernetic sculptures.

Formation 
He graduated with a degree in sculpture from the Rhode Island School of Design in 1999 and has  attended the Vermont Studio Center, exhibited Insect Lab through the Smithsonian, Society of arts and Crafts in Boston, showcased by Neiman Marcus and Anthropologie, Edmund Scientifics and designed three book covers in addition to hand fabricating the Solstice Award annually for the Science Fiction Writers of America.

References

External links
Insect Lab Studio
 Device Gallery
  Bein Art
  Ubu Studio

American contemporary artists
Libby, Marc
Living people
Year of birth missing (living people)